José Vicente Anaya (January 22, 1947 – August 1, 2020) was a Mexican writer, poet and cultural journalist.

Anaya was born on January 22, 1947, in Villa Coronado, Chihuahua, Mexico. He wrote over thirty books and was part of the Infrarealism poetry movement in Mexico City. He also translated poems of Allen Ginsberg and Carl Sandburg.

Anaya died on August 1, 2020, in Mexico City, aged 73.

References

1947 births
2020 deaths
Mexican journalists
Male journalists
Mexican male poets
National Autonomous University of Mexico alumni
Writers from Chihuahua
20th-century Mexican poets
21st-century Mexican poets
20th-century Mexican male writers
21st-century Mexican male writers